Yangtze River Cableway is a aerial tramway line in downtown Chongqing, which initially opened in 1987. It was listed in Batch II of Chongqing Cultural Relics Protected Buildings on December 15, 2009.

Fares

Notes

References 

Yangtze River
Transport in China